Nannoarctia dentata is a moth of the family Erebidae. It is found in India.

References

Moths described in 1855
Spilosomina